1993 Yokohama Marinos season

Review and events

League results summary

League results by round

Competitions

Domestic results

J.League

Suntory series

NICOS series

Emperor's Cup

J.League Cup

International results

Asian Cup Winners' Cup

Player statistics

 † player(s) joined the team after the opening of this season.

Transfers

In:

Out:

Transfers during the season

In
Gustavo Zapata (from River Plate on November)

Out

Awards
J.League Top Scorer: Ramón Díaz
J.League Best XI: Shigetatsu Matsunaga, Masami Ihara, Ramón Díaz

References

Other pages
 J. League official site
 Yokohama F. Marinos official site

Yokohama Marinos
Yokohama F. Marinos seasons